The 1986 St. Louis Cardinals season was the team's 105th season in St. Louis, Missouri and its 95th season in the National League. The Cardinals went 79-82 during the season and finished 3rd in the National League East division.

Offseason
 December 6, 1985: Gary Rajsich was purchased from the Cardinals by the Chunichi Dragons.
 December 10, 1985: Joaquín Andújar was traded by the Cardinals to the Oakland Athletics for Mike Heath and Tim Conroy.
 December 10, 1985: Clint Hurdle was drafted by the Cardinals from the New York Mets in the 1985 rule 5 draft.
 December 15, 1985: Jerry White was signed as a free agent by the Cardinals.
 January 13, 1986: Vic Rodriguez was signed as a free agent by the Cardinals.
 January 14, 1986: Bret Barberie was drafted by the Cardinals in the 2nd round of the 1986 Major League Baseball Draft, but did not sign.
 March 21, 1986: Alan Knicely was signed as a free agent by the Cardinals.
 March 31, 1986: Tom Nieto was traded by the Cardinals to the Montreal Expos for Fred Manrique.

Regular season
Pitcher Todd Worrell won the Rookie of the Year Award this year, with a 2.08 ERA and 36 saves. This was the second consecutive year a Cardinal won the Rookie of the Year Award, with Vince Coleman winning the previous season, and the second time in team history that the Cardinals had two consecutive NL Rookie of the Year winners (Wally Moon in 1954 and Bill Virdon in 1955). Shortstop Ozzie Smith and outfielder Willie McGee won Gold Gloves this year.

The Cardinals played 116 games (of 161) in which they failed to hit a home run, the most of any team since the 1952 Washington Senators.

Season standings

Record vs. opponents

Opening Day starters
Jack Clark
Vince Coleman
Mike Heath
Tom Herr
Willie McGee
Terry Pendleton
Ozzie Smith
John Tudor
Andy Van Slyke

Notable transactions
 April 1, 1986: Brian Harper was released by the Cardinals.
 April 11, 1986: Ray Burris was signed as a free agent by the Cardinals.
 June 12, 1986: Jerry White was released by the Cardinals.
 July 19, 1986: César Cedeño was signed as a free agent by the Cardinals.
 July 24, 1986: Steve Lake was signed as a free agent by the Cardinals.
 August 10, 1986: Mike Heath was traded by the Cardinals to the Detroit Tigers for Ken Hill and a player to be named later. The Tigers completed the deal by sending Mike Laga to the Cardinals on September 2.
 August 27, 1986: Ray Burris was released by the St. Louis Cardinals.

Roster

Player stats

Batting

Starters by position
Note: Pos = Position; G = Games played; AB = At bats; H = Hits; Avg. = Batting average; HR = Home runs; RBI = Runs batted in

Other batters
Note: G = Games played; AB = At bats; H = Hits; Avg. = Batting average; HR = Home runs; RBI = Runs batted in

Pitching

Starting pitchers
Note: G = Games pitched; IP = Innings pitched; W = Wins; L = Losses; ERA = Earned run average; SO = Strikeouts

Other pitchers
Note: G = Games pitched; IP = Innings pitched; W = Wins; L = Losses; ERA = Earned run average; SO = Strikeouts

Relief pitchers
Note: G = Games pitched; W = Wins; L = Losses; SV = Saves; ERA = Earned run average; SO = Strikeouts

Awards and honors
 Vince Coleman, National League Stolen Base Leader, 107
 Willie McGee, Outfield, National League Gold Glove
 Ozzie Smith, Shortstop, National League Gold Glove
 Todd Worrell, National League Rookie of the Year

Farm system 

LEAGUE CHAMPIONS: St. Petersburg

References

External links
1986 St. Louis Cardinals At Baseball Reference
1986 St. Louis Cardinals team page at www.baseball-almanac.com

St. Louis Cardinals seasons
Saint Louis Cardinals season
St Louis